A tied-arch bridge is an arch bridge in which the outward horizontal forces of the arch(es) caused by tension at the arch ends to a foundation are countered by equal tension of its own gravity plus any element of the total deck structure such great arch(es) support. The arch(es) have strengthened chord(s) that run to a strong part of the deck structure or to independent tie-rods below the arch ends.

Description 

Thrusts downwards on a tied-arch bridge deck are translated, as tension, by vertical ties between the deck and the arch, tending to flatten it and thereby to push its tips outward into the abutments, like for other arch bridges. However, in a tied-arch or bowstring bridge, these movements are restrained not by the abutments but by the strengthened chord, which ties these tips together, taking the thrusts as tension, rather like the string of a bow that is being flattened. Therefore, the design is also called a bowstring-arch or bowstring-girder bridge. 

The elimination of horizontal forces at the abutments allows tied-arch bridges to be constructed with less robust foundations; thus they can be situated atop elevated piers or in areas of unstable soil.  In addition, since they do not depend on horizontal compression forces for their integrity, tied-arch bridges can be prefabricated offsite, and subsequently floated, hauled or lifted into place.  Notable bridges of this type include the Fremont Bridge in Portland, Oregon as well as the first "computer designed" bridge of this type the Fort Pitt Bridge in Pittsburgh, Pennsylvania.

Both the tied-arch bridge and the self-anchored suspension bridge place only vertical loads on the anchorage, and so are suitable where large horizontal forces are difficult to anchor.

Variants

Shouldered tied-arch 
Some tied-arch bridges only tie a segment of the main arch directly and prolong the strengthened chord to tie to the top ends of auxiliary (half-)arches. The latter usually support the deck from below and join their bottom feet to those of the main arch(es). The supporting piers at this point may be slender, because the outward-directed horizontal forces of main and auxiliary arch ends counterbalance. The whole structure is self-anchored. Like the simple case it exclusively places vertical loads on all ground-bound supports.

An example is the Fremont Bridge in Portland, Oregon which is the second-longest tied-arch bridge in the world and also classifies as a through arch bridge. The Chaotianmen Bridge in Chongqing is a tied-arch, through arch and a truss arch bridge.

Contrarily, the Hart Bridge uses a cantilevered trussed arch, it is self-anchored, but its arch is non-tied. In particular the bridge deck is suspended, but does not tie the arch ends.

Multi-span discrete tied-arch 
Tied arch bridges may consist of successively lined up tied arches in places where a single span is not sufficient. An example for this is the Godavari Arch Bridge in Rajahmundry, India. It has four separate supports on each pier and carries the South Central Railway Line of India. It was designed for 250 km/h rail services.

Multi-span continuous tied-arch 
Like for multi-span continuous beam bridges the tying chord continually spans over all piers. The arches feet coincide (fuse) at the bridge piers. A good visual indication are shared supports at the piers. Dynamic loads are distributed between spans.

This type may be combined with the shouldered tied-arch design discussed above. An example for this is Dashengguan Bridge in Nanjing, China. Its two main arches are shouldered by short auxiliary arches. It is both, a (rigid) tied-arch and a cantilevered trussed arch design. Because the traffic runs through the structural envelope, it is also a through arch bridge. Guandu Bridge in New Taipei, Taiwan is a non-trussed example with three main arches augmented by two auxiliary arch segments at the bridge portals.

The Infinity Bridge uses two arches of different height and span length that both bifurcate before their apex. Above its single, middle-displaced river pier the deck lies between the arches. Contrarily each abutment on the riverbanks supports a single arch end only, in the middle of the deck. The tying chord(s) consist of a composite deck structure. Four post tensioned coil steel cables, two to each side of the walking deck, are locked in place by orthogonally run steel beams every 7.5 meters. The hangers are joined to each of these beams between each cable pair. Since the beams extend the width of the post-tensioned concrete deck, the tensing cable pairs remain visible.

A close-up of the river pier shows that the structural dead load is tied per span: The larger arch span uses thicker tensing cables and the reflex segments are not suspended from, but supported by steel beams, essentially completing the arches at the river pier. However, for dynamic and non-uniform loads the visually defining arch continuations must not be neglected.

Single tied-arch per span 
Usually, for a single span, two tied-arches are placed in parallel alongside the deck, so the deck lies in between the arches. Axial tied-arch or single tied-arch bridges have at most one tied-arch per span that is usually centered in the middle of the bridge deck. An example for this is Hoge Brug in Maastricht. Since it has hinged hangers it might also classify as a Nielsen bridge who held a patent on tied-arch bridges with hinged hangers from 1926.

Tilted tied-arch 
Some designs tilt the arches outward or inward with respect to the axis running along the bridge deck.

Tied-arch twin 
In analogy to twin bridges, two tied arch bridges erected side by side to increase traffic capacity, but structurally independent, may be referred to by tied arch twin bridges. Each in return may use a single- or multi-span, discrete or continuous tied-arch design.

Differentiation 
A bowstring truss bridge is similar in appearance to a tied-arch; however, the bowstring truss behaves as truss, not an arch.  The visual distinction is a tied-arch bridge will not have substantial diagonal members between the vertical members.

Issues 

In a 1978 advisory issued by the Federal Highway Administration (FHWA), the FHWA noted that tied-arch bridges are susceptible to problems caused by poor welds at the connection between the arch rib and the tie girders, and at the connection between the arch and vertical ties. In addition, problems with electroslag welds, while not isolated to tied-arch bridges, resulted in costly, time-consuming and inconveniencing repairs. The structure as a whole was described as  nonredundant; failure of either of the two tie girders would result in failure of the entire structure.

See also
 Through arch bridge
 James Barney Marsh

References

Gallery of tied-arch bridges

 
Truss bridges by type
Arch bridges